Rachel Wilson (born 1977) is a Canadian actress.

Rachel Wilson may also refer to:

 Rachel Wilson (neurobiologist), an American neurologist
 Rachel Wilson (One Life to Live), a fictional character on the ABC Daytime soap opera One Life to Live
 Rachel Wilson (The Amazing World of Gumball), a fictional character in The Amazing World of Gumball